Babingtonite is a calcium iron manganese inosilicate mineral with the formula . It is unusual in that iron(III) completely replaces the aluminium so typical of silicate minerals. It is a very dark green to black translucent (in thin crystals or splinters) mineral crystallizing in the triclinic system with typically radial short prismatic clusters and druzy coatings. It occurs with zeolite minerals in cavities in volcanic rocks. Babingtonite contains both iron(II) and iron(III) and shows weak magnetism. It has a Mohs hardness of 5.5 to 6 and a specific gravity of 3.3.

It was first described in 1824 from samples from Arendal, Aust-Agder, Norway (which is its type locality) and was named after the Irish physician and mineralogist William Babington (1757–1833).

It is the official mineral (mineral emblem) of the Commonwealth of Massachusetts. The first published report of babingtonite in Massachusetts was by Francis Alger in 1844, who credited Thomas Nuttall with its discovery in Charlestown (now Somerville). The location was the Granite Street quarry, formerly known as the Milk Row quarry.

Image gallery

References

External links
Mineral galleries

Calcium minerals
Manganese minerals
Iron(II,III) minerals
Inosilicates
Symbols of Massachusetts
Triclinic minerals
Minerals in space group 2